Helena R. Asamoah-Hassan (born 1950s in Cape Coast) is a Ghanaian librarian who is the present  Executive Director of African Library and Information Associations and Institutions (AfLIA), the Board Chair for the Ghana Library Authority and the Secretary General of African Regional Memory of the World Committee

Career 
She is the immediate past University Librarian  of the Kwame Nkrumah University of Science and Technology (KNUST). President of the Ghana Library Association from 2002 to 2006, and the first president of the African Library and Information Associations and Institutions (AfLIA).  She served as the Chairperson of the International Advisory Committee for UNESCO’s Memory of the World Programme 2013 – 2015. A member of the IFLA Governing Board 2010 - 2012 and the Chairperson of the Management Committee  of the Consortium of Academic and Research Libraries in Ghana (CARLIGH) as well as a founding member from March 2004 to 2013

Education 
Her education started at the Breman Asikuma Roman Catholic School, (Takoradi), Howard Memorial Primary School (Takoradi) and continued at the Nyaniba Middle Boarding School (Nkroful), where she obtained her middle school certificate and then to Konongo Odumasi Secondary School for her secondary education. She gained admission to study Library Science at  Ahmadu Bello University, Zaria, Nigeria (1977) for a bachelor's degree. she obtained her  Master of Arts Degree in Library Studies (University of Ghana, 1981), and a PhD from the Kwame Nkrumah University of Science and Technology (KNUST, 2011).

Positions Held
Positions held by Dr. Helena Asamoah-Hassan include and not limited to the following:

 Commissioner, National Media Commission of Ghana, 2003 to 2006
Member, Board of Governors, Konongo Odumasi Secondary School, (KOSS) February 1998 to 2014.
 Member, Executive Committee of UST Branch of UTAG, January 1997 to December 1998.
 Treasurer, UST Branch of UTAG, January 1999 to 2001
 Treasurer, UTAG National, September 1999 to 2001
 Member, Board of Directors, New Times Corporation, Ghana, May   2011 to 2013

Publications 
As a Librarian and a leader, she has contributed to knowledge in all aspects of Librarianship having  ninety six (96) papers to her credit. These papers were presented at Conferences and seminars at national and International level.

 Growth of African Research, Equity in Access and Dissemination of African content - the Catalysts.
 AfLIA and Library Human Capital Development for Africa’s development. 
 The Consortium of Academic and Research Libraries in Ghana (CARLIGH)- History & Way Forward. Presented at a CARLIGH meeting held in Accra in March 2019
 The African Library and Information Association (AfLIA). Presented at the GLA Conference in Accra, 6 December 2017
 Contribution of Libraries to Development in Africa. Presented at the Side Event of the UN High Level Political Forum on Sustainable Development, New York, USA, June 2017
 The Scholarly e-Information Access in Ghana – An Overview. Presented at the UNESCO –CERN Workshop held at KNUST, Kumasi, in December 2016
 UN agenda 2030: Sustainable Development Goals and Libraries. Presented at the International Workshop on UN Agenda 2030 and AU Agenda 2063 held at the Balme Library, University of Ghana, Legon, 5th  – 6 May 2016
The Library and the Scholarly Community. Presented at the Collaborative Publishing Workshop organised by PKP/CARLIGH on 4 May 2016 at CSIR INSTI, Accra
Sustaining CoP with a Strategic Plan. Presented at the Volta River Authority (VRA) of Ghana Staff held at Akosombo, 21 March 2016
Library Landscape in Ghana. Presented Online to Students of Melanie Sellar of San Jose University, USA on 2 November 2015.
INELI – Sub Saharan Africa (INELI-SSA): Plans and Prospects. Presented at Global INELI meeting held at the Bill & Melinda Foundation Offices, Seattle, USA in May 2015 .
An Informed Youth in a Competitive Global World - a Dependable Partner in Decision-Making 
Embracing electronic scholarly publishing in Africa; the Kwame Nkrumah University of Science and Technology (KNUST) Library, Kumasi, Ghana as a case study.
University Library partnership and funding in West Africa
Violence against Women
Gender and Development
Widowhood Practices among the Akan of Ghana - Yesterday and Today
Women Creating a Sturdy Foundation for Social Growth.
Starting a new scholarly journal: the library's role in promoting scholarly publishing
Transforming Anglophone Library Associations in West Africa
Strengthening the Capacities of Women of the West African Sub-Region for Peace Building
Memory of the World (MoW) Programme – a Summary Paper presented at the UNESCO Forum, WLIC/ IFLA Conference in Milan, Italy.
A Library ready for 21st century services: the case of the University of Science and Technology Library, Kumasi, Ghana. 
Information: The Oil in the Wheel of National Development

Awards
BioMed Central's Open Access Advocate of the Year
IFLA Service Medal – International Federation of Library Associations and Institutions ( IFLA), 2012
Certificate of Honour and Life Member, Ahmadu Bello University, Zaria, Nigeria,  Society of Library Science Students, from June 1988.
Fellow, Ghana Library Association, 2006

References

External links 
KNUSTSpace:Library, Ghana
Consortium of Academic and Research Libraries in Ghana (CARLIGH)
International Federation of Library Associations and Institutions ( IFLA)

1950s births
Living people
Ghanaian librarians
Ghanaian women librarians
People from Central Region (Ghana)